John Gresham (1529 – c. 1586), of Mayfield, Sussex, North End, near Fulham, Middlesex and Bishopsgate Street, London, was an English Member of Parliament. He represented New Windsor in 1563, Horsham in 1571 and Newton in 1572.

References

1529 births
1586 deaths
People from Mayfield, East Sussex
People from Fulham
English MPs 1563–1567
English MPs 1571
English MPs 1572–1583